James F. Prendergast (February 5, 1917 – April 30, 1985) was a former Democratic member of the Pennsylvania House of Representatives.
 He served in the United States Marine Corps in the Second World War, where he lost his right arm fighting in the Battle of Saipan. He received the Navy Cross and two Purple Hearts for his service.

References

Democratic Party members of the Pennsylvania House of Representatives
1917 births
1985 deaths
20th-century American politicians
United States Marine Corps personnel of World War II